The pseudo-Council of Sinuessa was a purported gathering of bishops in 303 at Sinuessa, Italy, the purpose being a trial of Marcellinus on charges of apostasy. It is generally accepted that the gathering never took place and that the purported council documents were forged for political purposes in the 6th century during the schism between Symmachus and Laurentius, who both claimed the Holy See. The collection of forgeries, including the Council of Sinuessa, is collectively known as the Symmachian forgeries.

The Catholic Encyclopedia describes

The Latin phrase "quia prima sedes non judicatur a quoquam" means roughly "for the occupant of the highest see cannot be judged by anyone", and the anecdote was produced in later centuries as evidence for the doctrine of papal supremacy.

Forged account
A primary Latin account of the pseudo-Council of Sinuessa was collected by Giovanni Domenico Mansi in 1759.
Döllinger summarizes the commonly-received account:

Döllinger dates the forgery to the reign of Symmachus, when Symmachus himself was being forced to answer to a synod convened by Theodoric, and himself was being threatened with deposition.

Later uses and criticism

The story of Marcellinus and the Council of Sinuessa has been cited by later writers in support of papal supremacy.

Vice versa, one scholar writes that during the reign of Antipope Alexander V, Jean Gerson used the story "to prove the legitimacy of a council assembled without the authority of the pope."

References

4th-century church councils
Christian folklore
Pseudohistory
Religious hoaxes